Grand bargain or Grand Bargain may refer to:

 Grand bargain (United States, 2011), an attempted United States budgeting compromise
 "Grand Bargain", a phrase popularized by Canadian diplomat Allan Gotlieb
 A 2003 term for the proposed normalization of U.S.-Iran relations; See Nicholas Kristof
 Grand Bargain (humanitarian reform), a set of 51 “commitments” from the 2016 World Humanitarian Summit
 Grand Bargain!, a 2018 album by Poster Children
 The Grand Bargain, a phrase used in reference to a deal following Detroit's 2013 bankruptcy

See also
 Bargain (disambiguation)